Pine Log Mountain is located in the U.S state of Georgia with a summit elevation of . The peak is three miles west of the town of Waleska separated only by the gated community of Lake Arrowhead. The summit falls within Cherokee County, although the majority of the mountain range trails into Bartow County including other peaks of Little Pine Log Mountain, Bear Mountain and Hanging Mountain. The Appalachian range does not rise above 2,000 feet again until many miles further southwest in the Talladega National Forest in Alabama.

Recreation and Uses
The majority of the Pine Log Mountain range falls within a wildlife management area, although the peak is excluded slightly to the east.  The actual summit houses a radio tower.  The land is owned by a paper company who leases the property to the state for proper management.  This allows for a wide range of multi-use; mountain biking, birding, fishing, hiking and hunting are some of the popular activities enjoyed in the area.  There are also several hiking trails on surrounding peaks that offer views of the Pine Log Ridge. It is also believed that Pine Log may have been mined for iron as was Red Top Mountain State Park to the south.

Significance
Pine Log lies within the exurban reaches of Atlanta's metropolitan area. The sprawling urban landscape of the city makes this wilderness a refuge for wildlife. Although the peak is just outside protected boundaries, it is the second-highest point in metro Atlanta, behind adjacent Bear Mountain. The county seat of Bartow, Cartersville, claims Vineyard and Pine mountains, which are protected and offer views of Pine Log to the north. The Etowah River flows through these peaks and upstream forms Lake Allatoona.

See also
Pine Log Creek
List of mountains in Georgia (U.S. state)

References

External links

 
 
 
 

Landforms of Bartow County, Georgia
Protected areas of Bartow County, Georgia
Landforms of Cherokee County, Georgia
Protected areas of Cherokee County, Georgia
Mountains of Georgia (U.S. state)